The 2008 United States Shadow Senator election in the District of Columbia took place on November 4, 2008, to elect a shadow member to the United States Senate to represent the District of Columbia. The member was only recognized by the District of Columbia and not officially sworn or seated by the United States Senate.

Incumbent Shadow Senator Paul Strauss won reelection to a third term.

Primary elections 
Party primaries took place on September 9, 2008.

Democratic primary

Candidates 
 Paul Strauss, incumbent shadow senator
 Philip Pannell

Results

General election 
Strauss faced Republican Nelson Rimensnyder, D.C. Statehood Green candidate Keith R. Ware and Libertarian candidate Damien Lincoln Ober. As is usual for Democrats in the District, Strauss won in a landslide.

Candidates 
 Paul Strauss (Democratic)
 Nelson Rimensnyder (Republican)
 Keith R. Ware (D.C. Statehood Green)
 Damien Lincoln Ober (Libertarian)

Results

References 

2008 elections in Washington, D.C.
Washington, D.C., Shadow Senator elections